James McCleary may refer to:

James McCleary (politician) (1853–1924), American politician in Minnesota
Ernie McCleary (James Warren McCleary, c. 1923–2012), Northern Irish footballer

See also
James McCleery (1837–1871), Union Army officer and U.S. Representative from Louisiana